Carolina Forest High School is located in Horry County, South Carolina, United States, in the Carolina Forest attendance area. The school is one of nine high schools within Horry County Schools. The school serves parts of Myrtle Beach and eastern Conway. Approximately 2400 students attend Carolina Forest High School (grades 9–12) each year. It is led by Principal Gaye Driggers.

Accreditation
The school is accredited by the South Carolina Department of Education and the Commission of Colleges of the Southern Associating Colleges and Schools.

Notable alumni

See also
High school
Public education
Secondary education
List of high schools in South Carolina

References

External links
School website
Horry County Schools website

Educational institutions established in 1997
Public high schools in South Carolina
Schools in Horry County, South Carolina